The Slavic migrations to the Balkans began in the mid-6th century and first decades of the 7th century in the Early Middle Ages. The rapid demographic spread of the Slavs was followed by a population exchange, mixing and language shift to and from Slavic. The settlement was facilitated by the substantial decrease of the Balkan population during the Plague of Justinian. Another reason was the Late Antique Little Ice Age from 536 to around 660 CE and the series of wars between the Sasanian Empire and the Avar Khaganate against the Eastern Roman Empire. The backbone of the Avar Khaganate consisted of Slavic tribes. After the failed siege of Constantinople in the summer of 626, they remained in the wider Balkan area after they had settled the Byzantine provinces south of the Sava and Danube rivers, from the Adriatic towards the Aegean up to the Black Sea. Exhausted by several factors and reduced to the coastal parts of the Balkans, Byzantium was not able to wage war on two fronts and regain its lost territories, so it reconciled with the establishment of Sklavinias influence and created an alliance with them against the Avar and Bulgar Khaganates.

Background
Before the great migration period, the population of the Balkans was possibly composed of local Illyrians and Thracians who had been Romanized and Hellenized. There may have also been small communities of Heruli, Bastarnae, Langobards and Sciri. After the destructive campaigns of Attila the Hun and the Goths who were previously foederati, which resulted in the fall of the West Roman Empire, Eastern Roman Emperor Justinian I began the reconstruction of fortresses, cities, and Christianity. However, the Plague of Justinian (from 541–549 until the mid-8th century) decimated the native population, resulting in the weakening of the Pannonian and Danubian Limes. Various factors, including the Late Antique Little Ice Age and population pressure, pushed the migration of the Early Slavs who were also led by the Pannonian Avars.

History

The Slavs who settled in the Balkans are divided into two groups, Antae and Sclaveni. Small groups of Slavs had probably participated in the campaigns of the Huns and Germanic tribes since the end of the 5th century. The first certain Slavic raids date to the early 6th century during the time of the Eastern Roman Emperor Justin I (518–527), coinciding with the end of the Vitalian revolt (511–518). Procopius recorded that in 518 a large army of the Antae, "who dwell close to the Sclaveni", crossed the Danube river into Roman territory. They continued with ever-faster and stronger incursions during the time of Justinian I (527–565), with Procopius recording that the whole of Illyricum and Thrace was pillaged almost every year by Huns, Sclaveni, and Antae, who did enormous damage to the native Roman population, making the region a "Scythian desert". As the Danubian Limes lacked garrisons, Justinian I made an alliance with the Antae to stop barbarian intrusions in Antae territory in the Lower Danube. This caused more Slavic intrusions from the region of Podunavlje, but was also followed by peaceful permanent settlement on  Byzantine territory, which began in 550 or 551. Things changed with the arrival of the Pannonian Avars, who fought against the Antae and subjugated masses of both Antae and Sclaveni. After the death of Justinian I, the new Roman Emperor Justin II (565–574) halted the payment of subsidies to the Avars, which sparked an almost  century-long war. With the Byzantines preoccupied with the 572–591 and 602–628 wars with the Sasanian Empire, Avars and Slavs made devastating intrusions from Northern Italy to Southern Greece, and by the 7th century, the Slavs had settled in all the Balkans and Peloponnese. Roman Emperor Maurice in his Balkan campaigns (582–602) did not manage to stop the successful sieges of Sirmium, Viminacium and Thessalonica, or the destruction of various cities including Justiniana Prima and Salona, culminating with the Siege of Constantinople (626).

According to Procopius, Slavic social and political organization was a kind of demokratia in which the tribal community was ruled by the council of nobles. This allowed them to stay together regardless of environmental factors, but according to Johannes Koder, "impeded coordinated military resistance against the enemy", which put them in a situation of being under foreign political leadership. When the Slavs and later the Avars entered the Balkans they didn't have advanced siege warfare, but around 587 they acquired this knowledge from contact with Byzantine culture, and because of this no urban settlement or fort could oppose them any more. With the destruction of Roman fortifications came a loss of Byzantine military and administrative power in Roman provinces. The native population was often decimated, and the devastated lands were resettled by smaller or larger groups of Slavs. Settlement among the natives, often replacing them, happened in the autumn, when winter supplies were secured for the people and animals. After mixing with the natives who survived in smaller communities, depending on the region, the Slavic tribes mostly had names of toponymic origin. 

They densely populated the Balkans, more precisely the Praetorian prefecture of Illyricum: 
in the late Roman province of Noricum was the Slavic settlement of the Eastern Alps (including Carantanians) 
in Pannonia were the Pannonian Slavs (with Pannonian Dulebes)
the province of Dalmatia was settled by the White Croats (and Guduscani), Serbs, Narentines, Zachlumians, Travunijans, and Kanalites
Praevalitana was settled by Diocleans
the provinces of Moesia and Dardania were inhabited by Merehani, Braničevci, Timočani and Praedenecenti
provinces of Dacia Ripensis and Moesia Secunda were inhabited by Seven Slavic tribes and Severians
in part of the Diocese of Thrace were Smolyani, and Strymonites 
in all of the Diocese of Macedonia were numerous tribes of Drougoubitai, Berziti, Sagudates, Rhynchinoi, Baiounitai, Belegezites, Melingoi and Ezeritai
Some Slavs in Thrace were also relocated to Anatolia, later known as Asia Minor Slavs.

However, after the settlement of the Slavs, the Balkans turned to paganism and entered the Dark Ages, in which most of Europe had been until then. Many Slavs soon began to accept the cultural customs of the highly civilized Byzantine provinces, and in order to expand their cultural and state influence on the South Slavs, the Byzantines began the process of Christianization. The weak Eastern Roman Empire during the 7th and 8th centuries and its absence as a European power enabled the formation of a new empire in Western Europe. 

Eventually the Slavs settled in the late Roman provinces of Pannonia and Dalmatia reached a substantial amount of autonomy or independence, establishing Sklavinias influenced by both Francia and Byzantine Empire. In most part of the former diocese of Dacia and Thracia the Sklavinias fell under the rule of the First Bulgarian Empire, while in the diocese of Macedonia (Southern Balkans and Peloponnese) they lacked political organization, because of which the Byzantine Empire regained control and after 200 years they became assimilated by the Greek-speaking majority, and on the territory of today's Albania by the Albanian-speaking majority.

Archaeology
Slavs mostly travelled along the river valleys, but while in the Southern Balkans, they travelled  where they encountered greater resistance by the native Byzantine Greek forces, along the mountain ranges. Very soon after their arrival the typical Slavic archaeological culture was changed by the influence of native Byzantine cultures. According to the archaeological data the main movement of the Slavs was from the Middle Danube valley. The Ipotesti–Candesti culture was composed of a mixture of Slavic Prague-Korchak and mostly Penkovka culture with some elements of the so-called Martinovka culture. The majority of the Slavic population in the Balkans and Peloponnese was accordingly descending from Antae. According to archaeological data and historical sources, the Slavs mostly were engaged in agriculture, cultivating proso millet, which they introduced, wheat, but also flax. They grew various fruits and vegetables, and learned viticulture. They were actively engaged in animal husbandry, using horses for military and agricultural purposes, and raising oxen and goats. Those living in hilly terrain mostly lived as shepherds. Those living near lakes, rivers, and seas also used various hooks and nets for fishing. They were known to be especially skilled in woodworking and shipbuilding, but also knew about metalworking and pottery.

Genetics

According to the 2013 autosomal IBD survey "of recent genealogical ancestry over the past 3,000 years at a continental scale", the speakers of Serbo-Croatian language share a very high number of common ancestors dated to the migration period approximately 1,500 years ago with Poland and Romania-Bulgaria cluster among others in Eastern Europe. It is concluded to be caused by the Hunnic and Slavic expansion, which was a "relatively small population that expanded over a large geographic area", particularly "the expansion of the Slavic populations into regions of low population density beginning in the sixth century" and that it is "highly coincident with the modern distribution of Slavic languages". According to Kushniarevich et al. 2015, the Hellenthal et al. 2014 IBD analysis, also found "multi-directional admixture events among East Europeans (both Slavic and non-Slavic), dated to around 1,000–1,600 YBP" which coincides with "the proposed time-frame for the Slavic expansion". The Slavic influence is "dated to 500-900 CE or a bit later with over 40-50% among Bulgarians, Romanians, and Hungarians". The 2015 IBD analysis found that the South Slavs have lower proximity to Greeks than with East Slavs and West Slavs and that there's an "even patterns of IBD sharing among East-West Slavs–'inter-Slavic' populations (Hungarians, Romanians and Gagauz)–and South Slavs, i.e. across an area of assumed historic movements of people including Slavs". The slight peak of shared IBD segments between South and East-West Slavs suggests a shared "Slavonic-time ancestry". According to a recent admixture analysis of Western Balkan, the South Slavs show a genetic uniformity, with the modeled ancestral genetic component of Balto-Slavs among South Slavs being between 55% and 70%. According to 2017 admixture study of Peloponnesian Greek population, "the Slavic ancestry of Peloponnesean subpopulations ranges from 0.2 to 14.4%".

The 2006 Y-DNA study results "suggest that the Slavic expansion started from the territory of present-day Ukraine, thus supporting the hypothesis that places the earliest known homeland of Slavs in the basin of the middle Dnieper". According to genetic studies until 2020, the distribution, variance and frequency of the Y-DNA haplogroups R1a and I2 and their subclades R-M558, R-M458 and I-CTS10228 among South Slavs are in correlation with the spreading of Slavic languages during the medieval Slavic expansion from Eastern Europe, most probably from the territory of present-day Ukraine and Southeastern Poland. 

A 2022 archaeogenetic study published in Science compared ancient, medieval and modern population samples and found that the medieval Slavic migrations "profoundly affected the region", resulting in the reduction of Anatolian Neolithic ancestry in Southeastern Europe. Pre-Slavic Balkan populations have the most of the Anatolian Neolithic component of ancestry, whereas present-day Slavs outside the Balkans have the least, "with present-day people from Southeastern Europe intermediate between the two extremes". Among present-day populations "Greeks and Albanians have more Anatolian Neolithic ancestry than their South Slavic neighbors".

See also
 Extreme weather events of 535–536
 Bulgars
 Onogurs
 Utigurs
 Kutrigurs
 Outline of Slavic history and culture
 Pre-modern human migration

Notes

References

Sources
 
 
 
 
 
 
 
 
 
 
 
 

7th-century conflicts
7th century in the Byzantine Empire
Wars involving the Byzantine Empire
Invasions
South Slavic history
History of the Balkans